Pierre-Euclide Roy (November 2, 1826 – October 1, 1882) was a Quebec businessman and politician.

He was born at Saint-Roch-de-l'Achigan, close to L'Assomption.  He was the son of Pierre-Octave Roy, a merchant, and Josephte Beaudry.

Roy became a merchant at Saint-Pie, near Saint-Hyacinthe.  He was also the treasurer of the Phillipsburg, Farnham and Yamaska Railway Company.

On March 6, 1848, he married Émilie Aurélie Auger.  He later married Emma Davignon.

Roy was appointed to the Legislative Council of Quebec on November 19, 1873, representing the division of Saurel.  He supported the Conservative Party of Quebec.

Roy died in office at Saint-Pie, on October 31 1882.

References 

1826 births
1882 deaths
Members of the Legislative Council of Quebec